Brunn am Gebirge (Central Bavarian: Brunn aum Gebiage) is a town in the district of Mödling in the Austrian state of Lower Austria.

History
Excavations from the Neolithic period show that the area was already inhabited 6000 BC and Brunn making it the earliest known farming settlement in Austria. Also Awarengräber that were found in Mödling, suggest that inhabited the area at that time already. Because of excavations, it is believed that the Roman settlement here was for veterans.

In modern times, it was the birthplace (1890) of the composer Hans Gál.

Culture
Since 2007 Brunn am Gebirge is organizer of the International Piano Blues and Boogie Woogie Festival where Little Willie Littlefield, Carl Sonny Leyland, Axel Zwingenberger, Dana Gillespie, Sonny and his Wild Cows, Michael Pewny, Stella Jones, Kim Cooper from The Rounder Girls, Lila Ammons, Vince Weber, Silvan Zingg, Axel Ramerseder, Mojo Blues Band, Jan Preston, Martin Pyrker, Al Cook, The Untuchables, The Hot Shakers, Ed Philips, Meena Cryle, The Boogie Boys, Dan Popek, Wendy De Witt, Angela Brown, Janice Harrington and many more performed.

Population

References

Cities and towns in Mödling District